Alon or Allon  is an Israeli settlement in the West Bank, organized as a community settlement. Alon is located to the east of Jerusalem, next to the Palestinian town of 'Anata, part of whose lands were expropriated to build Alon. Situated along the edge of the Judean desert, the settlement has a diverse religiously observant and secular population.

The international community considers Israeli settlements in the West Bank illegal under international law, but the Israeli government disputes this.

History
According to ARIJ, Israel confiscated 328 dunams  of land  from the Palestinian town of 'Anata in order to construct Alon.

Named after Yigal Allon, it was founded in 1990 by a number of area residents under the aegis of the Amana settlement organisation, it was originally considered to be part of nearby Kfar Adumim so as to minimise opposition in an atmosphere in which the question of settlement was becoming increasingly controversial. Children study in a mixed secular/observant public-religious school in nearby Kfar Adumim, and attend highschool in Jerusalem.

Alon was one of a number of settlements linked by a road secretly built by settlers in 1995.  The road links the settlement of Almon to the settlements of Kfar Adumim, Nofei Prat, and Alon. According to Pinhas Wallerstein, then head of the Mateh Binyamin Regional Council, the road was one of a number of secretly built roads under construction in the area.  Wallerstein claimed that as council head, he did not need permission to construct roads, but that he would stop construction if told by the Israel Defense Forces. He also said "What are they going to do, tell us to take the road away?  If the road is illegal let them take us to court."

Legal status
The international community considers Israeli settlements in the West Bank illegal under international law, but the Israeli government disputes this.

References

External links

Mixed Israeli settlements
Mateh Binyamin Regional Council
Populated places established in 1990
1990 establishments in the Palestinian territories
Community settlements
Israeli settlements in the West Bank